Jaclyn Marielle Jaffe is an American actress, singer and model.

Background 
Jaffe was born in Valencia, Santa Clarita, California. She made her feature film debut as Aphrodite Girl in the 2010 film Percy Jackson & the Olympians: The Lightning Thief. In April 2011, she landed a supporting role in Wes Craven's slasher film Scream 4, playing Olivia Morris.

Later that year she played the wife of Taylor Lautner's character in Funny or Die's spoof, Field of Dreams 2: Lockout. She participated with another Funny or Die short, Hollywood Takes a Stand Against Planking. She landed a recurring role on ABC Family's hit TV show The Secret Life of the American Teenager as "Clementine". Her most recent credit is the role of Tanner Tarlton in What About Love, still in post-production at this writing.

Filmography

Film

Television

Music videos

References

External links
 

American film actresses
American television actresses
Actresses from California
Female models from California
Living people
21st-century American actresses
People from Valencia, Santa Clarita, California
Year of birth missing (living people)